Controversy over ethnic and linguistic identity in Montenegro is an ongoing dispute over the ethnic and linguistic identity of several communities in Montenegro, a multiethnic and multilingual country in Southeastern Europe. There are several points of dispute, some of them related to identity of people who self-identify as ethnic Montenegrins, while some other identity issues are also related to communities of Serbs of Montenegro, Croats of Montenegro, Bosniaks of Montenegro and ethnic Muslims of Montenegro. All of those issues are mutually interconnected and highly politicized.

The central issue is whether self-identified Montenegrins constitute a distinct ethnic group or a subgroup of some other nation, as often claimed by self-identified Serbs. This divide has its historical roots in the first decades of the 20th century, during which the pivotal political issue was the dilemma between retaining national sovereignty of Montenegro, advocated by supporters of the Petrović-Njegoš dynasty, most notably Greens, i.e. members of the True People's Party, and supporters of integration with the Kingdom of Serbia, and consequently with other South Slavic peoples under the Karađorđević dynasty, advocated by the Whites (gathered around the People's Party). This dispute renewed during the dissolution of Yugoslavia and subsequent secession of Montenegro from the state union with Serbia after the 2006 Montenegrin independence referendum. According to the 2011 census data, 44.98% of people in Montenegro identify as ethnic Montenegrins, while 28.73% declare as ethnic Serbs; 42.88% said they spoke "Serbian" whereas 36.97% declared "Montenegrin" as their native language.

Nationalism in Montenegro

There are generally two variants of nationalism in Montenegro, pro-Montenegrin and pro-Serb.

History 
Metropolitan Danilo I (r. 1696–1735) called himself "Duke of the Serb land". Metropolitan Sava Petrović called his people, the Montenegrins, the "Serbian nation" (1766). Petar I Petrović-Njegoš (r. 1784–1830) was the conceiver of a plan to form a new Slavo-Serbian Empire by joining Bay of Kotor, Dubrovnik, Dalmatia, Herzegovina to Montenegro and some of the highland neighbours (1807), he also wrote "The Russian Czar would be recognized as the Tsar of the Serbs and the Metropolitan of Montenegro would be his assistant. The leading role in the restoration of the Serbian Empire belongs to Montenegro."

In the late 19th century Montenegro's aspirations mirrored that of Serbia — unification and independence of Serb-inhabited lands. Njegoš (r. 1830–1851), regarded the greatest Montenegrin poet, was a leading Serb figure and instrumental in codifying the Kosovo Myth as the central theme of the Serbian national movement. The Petrović-Njegoš dynasty tried to take the role as the Serb leader and unifier, but Montenegro's small size and weak economy led to the recognition of the primacy of the Karađorđević dynasty (in Serbia) in this respect. Although Montenegrins espoused a Serb identity, they were also proud of their state, especially in the Cetinje area, the capital of the Kingdom of Montenegro. The sense of distinct statehood bred an autonomist sentiment in part of the Montenegrin population following the unification with Serbia (and dissolution of Montenegro) in 1918.

During the First World War, a controversy over ethnic identity of Montenegrins was sparked by lawyer Ivo Pilar who claimed that during the early medieval times, territory of modern-day Montenegro belonged to Red Croatia, developing from that a theory of Croatian ethnic origin of Montenegrins. After the war, that theory was accepted and developed by Savić Marković Štedimlija, who claimed that Montenegrins were in fact a branch of Croatian people.

It has been argued by some that there was no separate Montenegrin nation before 1945; they claim that the language, history, religion and culture of Montenegro were considered unquestionably Serbian. Josef Korbel stated, in 1951, that "The Montenegrins proudly called themselves Serbs, and even today it would be difficult to find people of the older generations who would say they are Montenegrin. Only young Communists accept and propagate the theory of a Montenegrin nation."

The Anti-Fascist Council for the National Liberation of Yugoslavia (AVNOJ, 1942–45) recognized five constituent peoples of Yugoslavia: Serbs, Croats, Slovenes, Macedonians and Montenegrins.

Until the 1990s, most of the Montenegrins defined themselves as both Serbs and Montenegrins. The vast majority of Montenegrins declared themselves as Montenegrins in the 1971–1991 censuses because they were citizens of the Socialist Republic of Montenegro. The 1992 Montenegrin independence referendum, which Montenegrin separatists boycotted, saw 96% in favour of Montenegro remaining a part of rump Yugoslavia (FR Yugoslavia – Serbia and Montenegro). Until 1996, a 'pro-Serbian consensus predominated in Montenegrin politics'.

As Montenegro began to seek independence from Serbia with the Đukanović–Milošević split after the Yugoslav Wars, the Montenegrin nationalist movement emphasized the difference between the Montenegrin and Serbian identities and that the term "Montenegrin" never implied belonging to the wider Serb identity. The people had to make a choice whether they supported Montenegrin independence – the choosing of identity seems to have been based on their stance on independence. Now, those who supported independence redefined the Montenegrin identity as a separate identity (unlike the previous overlapping Montenegrin/Serbian identity espoused by the later rulers from the Montenegrin Petrović-Njegoš dynasty), while those who supported federation with Serbia increasingly insisted on their Serb identity.

According to historian Srdja Pavlović the Montenegrins preserved the sense of their political and cultural distinctiveness with regard to the other South Slavic groups and continuously reaffirmed it through history. According to Pavlović, the notion of Serbdom was understood by Montenegrins to be their belonging to the Eastern Orthodox faith and to Christianity in general, as well as the larger South Slavic context. They incorporated this idea in the building blocks of their national individuality. Because it was understood as the ideology of a constant struggle, this Montenegrin Serbdom did not stand in opposition to a distinct character of Montenegrin national identity. Rather it was used as a tool of pragmatic politics in order to achieve the final goal. Montenegrins used the terms Serbs and Serbdom whenever they referred to South Slavic elements rallied in an anti-Ottoman coalition and around Christian Cross. Whenever they referred to particular elements of their social structure and their political system, they used the term Montenegrin.

The pro-Yugoslav (unionist) side, headed by Momir Bulatović, stressed that Serbians and Montenegrins shared the same ethnicity (as Serbs) and evoked 'the unbreakable unity of Serbia and Montenegro, of one people and one flesh and blood'. Bulatović promoted an exclusive Serb identity for the majority Orthodox population.

Revisionism
There is an ongoing historical revisionism in Montenegro, where Montenegrin identity is promoted with the "Duklja (Doclean) narrative" as founding myth.

Demographic history

Language statistics in 2011
Serbian: 265,895 (42.88%)
Montenegrin: 229,251 (36.97%)
Bosnian: 33,077 (5.33%)
Albanian: 32,671 (5.27%)
Roma: 5,169 (0.83%)
Bosniak: 3,662 (0.59%)
Croatian: 2,791 (0.45%)
Others: 47,513 (7.68%)

Gallery

See also

 Controversy over ethnic and linguistic identity in Moldova
 Yugoslavism
 Serbian–Montenegrin unionism
 Macedonism

References

Sources

Further reading

External links

Politics of Montenegro
Serbian language
Montenegrin language
Montenegro
Linguistic controversies
Montenegro–Serbia relations